Bryson Jeremy Stott (born October 6, 1997) is an American professional baseball shortstop for the Philadelphia Phillies of Major League Baseball (MLB). He played college baseball at UNLV, and was selected by the Phillies in the first round of the 2019 Major League Baseball draft. He made his MLB debut in 2022.

Amateur career
Stott attended Desert Oasis High School in Enterprise, Nevada. He committed to University of Las Vegas (UNLV) to play college baseball. Both of Stott's parents attended UNLV and Stott's father played quarterback for the school's football team.

As a freshman at UNLV, Stott started all 54 games at shortstop, hitting .294/.359/.379 with one home run and 29 runs batted in (RBIs). As a sophomore in 2018, he started all 59 games, hitting .365/.442/.556 with four home runs, 32 RBI and an NCAA leading 30 doubles. After the season, he played for the Wareham Gatemen of the Cape Cod Baseball League and the United States collegiate national team. In 2019, his junior year, he batted .356 with ten home runs and 36 RBIs over 58 games.

Professional career
 Stott was considered one of the top prospects for the 2019 Major League Baseball draft. He was selected by the Philadelphia Phillies with the 14th overall pick. Stott signed with the Phillies on June 27, 2019 after agreeing to a $3.9 million signing bonus.

Stott made his professional debut with the Rookie-level Gulf Coast League Phillies before earning a promotion to the Williamsport Crosscutters of the Class A Short Season New York–Penn League. Over 48 games between the two teams, he slashed .295/.391/.494 with six home runs and 27 RBIs. To begin the 2021 season, he was assigned to the Jersey Shore BlueClaws of the High-A East. In June 2021, Stott was selected to play in the All-Star Futures Game. He earned promotions to the Reading Fightin Phils of the Double-A Northeast and the Lehigh Valley IronPigs of the Triple-A East during the season. Over 112 games between the three teams, Stott slashed .299/.390/.486 with 16 home runs and 49 RBIs. He was selected to play in the Arizona Fall League for the Peoria Javelinas following the season's end.

After impressing manager Joe Girardi during spring training, Stott was named to the Phillies' Opening Day roster for the 2022 season. He made his major league debut on April 8, 2022, recording a single, a double, and an RBI in the Phillies' 9–5 victory over the Oakland Athletics. After not starting a game since April 18 and being hitless in his last 18 at-bats, he was optioned to Lehigh Valley on April 25 in order to receive consistent playing time. After returning to the Phillies, Stott hit a walk-off three-run home run on June 5 to defeat the Los Angeles Angels. Despite a slow start to the season, in which he batted .188/.255/.307, Stott heated up after the All-Star Game, hitting .276/.331/.404 in the second half of the season.

In the 2022 regular season he batted .234/.295/.358 in 427 at bats. He played 83 games at shortstop, 47 at second base, and two at third base.

References

External links

UNLV Rebels bio

1997 births
Living people
Sportspeople from Las Vegas
Baseball players from Nevada
Major League Baseball infielders
Philadelphia Phillies players
UNLV Rebels baseball players
Wareham Gatemen players
United States national baseball team players
Florida Complex League Phillies players
Williamsport Crosscutters players
Jersey Shore BlueClaws players
Reading Fightin Phils players
Lehigh Valley IronPigs players
Peoria Javelinas players